West Virginia Route 95 is an east–west state highway in the Parkersburg, West Virginia area. The western terminus of the route is at West Virginia Route 68 west of Parkersburg. The eastern terminus is at Interstate 77/West Virginia Route 2 exit 173 in Parkersburg.

Major intersections

References

095
Transportation in Wood County, West Virginia